Arthur Allen may refer to:

Politicians
Arthur Allen (died 1558), MP for Ludgershall
Arthur Allen (Virginia politician) (died 1710), Virginia colonial politician, 22nd Speaker of the Virginia House of Burgesses, 1686–1688
Arthur Acland Allen (1868–1939), British Liberal Party politician, MP for Christchurch and Dunbartonshire
Arthur Allen (Labour politician) (1887–1981), British politician

Others
Arthur Allen (author) (born 1959), American author and journalist
Arthur Allen (Virginia Colony) (died 1669), commissioned Arthur Allen House
Arthur Allen II (c. 1652–1710), son of the above, inherited Arthur Allen House, possibly the same person as the Virginia politician
Arthur A. Allen (1885–1964), American ornithologist
Arthur Leigh Allen (1933–1992), American suspect in the Zodiac murders
Arthur Allen (general) (1894–1959), Australian general

See also
Arthur Allen House

Allen (surname)